Noraini binti Ahmad (Jawi: نورعيني بنت أحمد; born 7 November 1967) is a Malaysian politician who has served as the Member of Parliament (MP) for Parit Sulong since March 2008. She served as the Minister of Higher Education for the second term under the Barisan Nasional (BN) administration under former Prime Minister Ismail Sabri Yaakob from August 2021 to the collapse of BN administration in November 2022, the first term in the Perikatan Nasional (PN) administration under former Prime Minister Muhyiddin Yassin from March 2020 to her resignation in August 2021, the Deputy Minister of Human Resources in the BN administration under former Prime Ministers Abdullah Ahmad Badawi and Najib Razak and former Minister Subramaniam Sathasivam from March 2008 to April 2009 and Chairperson of the Public Accounts Committee (PAC) under the Pakatan Harapan (PH) administration from April 2019 to her ministerial appointment in March 2020. She is a member of the United Malays National Organisation (UMNO), a component party of the BN coalition. She has also served as the Women Chief of UMNO since June 2018 and Women Youth Chief of UMNO from March 2008 to April 2009. 

She has held other positions such as the Chairperson of the Malaysia External Trade Development Corporation (MATRADE) from 2013 to 2018 and led several federal agencies, including the Malaysian Network Information Centre and Astronautic Technology.

Early life and education
She is a graduate of the University of Saskatchewan, Saskatoon, Canada where she obtained her Bachelor of Commerce (double major in quantitative analysis and finance) in 1991, followed by a master's degree in business administration (MBA) from Universiti Tun Abdul Razak (UNIRAZAK) in 2005. She subsequently obtained her Doctor of Philosophy (PhD) in Development Management from Universiti Utara Malaysia (UUM) in 2016. She then enrolled into the Doctor of Business Administration (DBA) program at Asia e-University (AeU). The title of her DBA dissertation is “The Phenomenological Study of Women Entrepreneurs and their Impact on Socio-Economic Growth in Malaysia”. She will be one of the first Malaysians to complete the DBA in AeU via the APEL Q system. She completed her viva on 11 November 2021 and received positive feedback on her dissertation from examiners who requested no further amendments/corrections upon submission. She completed her second PhD in April 2022.

Political career
Noraini was first elected to federal Parliament in the 2008 general election, replacing incumbent Syed Hood Syed Edros. Immediately after the election, she was named Deputy Minister of Human Resources in the government of Abdullah Ahmad Badawi and served under the post until Abdullah's successor Najib Razak named his first cabinet in April 2009.

In the 2013 general election, Noraini won re-election to Parliament and was then appointed by the government as the chairperson of the Malaysia External Trade Development Corporation (Matrade). In the 2018 general election, she was re-elected once again albeit with a decreased majority.

Noraini was also the chairman of Commonwealth Women Parliamentarians from 2016 to 2019. The Commonwealth Women Parliamentarians (CWP) is a network of the Commonwealth Parliamentary Association that campaigns for gender equality and equal representation in Parliaments. On the international fora she became the first Malaysian to be elected as chairman of Commonwealth Women Parliamentarians (CWP) from 2016 to 2019. She was elected through voting at the 62nd Commonwealth Parliamentarians' Conference in London, United Kingdom. She garnered 53 votes beating Joyce Watson of Wales who received 15 votes, Poto Williams of New Zealand (10 votes) and Linda Reid from Canada who received 9 votes.  .

Election results

Honours

Honours of Malaysia
  :
  Companion Class I of the Order of Malacca (DMSM) – Datuk (2005)
  Grand Commander of the Order of Malacca (DGSM) – Datuk Seri (2020)
  :
  Knight Companion of the Order of Sultan Ahmad Shah of Pahang (DSAP) – Dato' (2005)

Honorary degrees 
  :
 Honorary Ph.D. degree in Management and Leadership from Indonesian Muslim University (2022)

Others 
 21st Century Partnership Program from Japanese Government - (2005)
 New Zealand's Prime Minister ASEAN Fellowship  - (2005)
 Chosen as 1990s' 10 People 10 Decades University of Saskathewan  - (2017)

Publications and appearances

 A Change in Narrative to Break the Bias – BERNAMA & The Malaysia Reserve, 2022
 Let's Call Out Gender Bias Daily - New Straits Times, 2022
 Pushing Education for Sustainable Development to Greater Heights - New Straits Times, 2022
 Sustainable Higher Education in Malaysia – BERNAMA, 2022
 Appreciating Our Language, Our Cultural Heritage - The Malaysia Reserve, 2021
 Honouring Higher Education Educators - The Star, 2021
 'Where Ideas Become Reality - New Straits Times, 2021
 Students Rise by Lifting Others - Free Malaysia Today, 2021
 Varsities Develop Future Leaders - New Straits Times, 2021
 Celebrating the Success of Women in Higher Education - The Star, 2021
 Simplifying Accommodation Search - New Straits Times, 2021
 PENJANA KPT-CAP to Boost Graduate Employability - New Straits Times, 2020
 Speech at the opening of the CWP Conference - The Parliamentarian, 2019
 The Commonwealth: Adding political value to global affairs in the 21st century - The Parliamentarian, 2019
 Women's Suffrage: A prerequisite to the gender equality agenda - The Parliamentarian, 2019
 Cyber Harassment Against Woman on Social Media - The Parliamentarian, 2019
 Economic Rights for Women - The Parliamentarian, 2018
 View from the CWP Chairperson - Women and democracy in Malaysia - The Parliamentarian, 2018
 If we want genuine positive change in the world, we need more women leaders. How can we persuade the word that the future is dependent on gender equality? - The Parliamentarian, 2017
 Women and Disabilities - The Parliamentarian, 2017
 Networking between Parliaments and creating alliances - The Parliamentarian, 2017
 Job creation and growth: solutions to inequality - The Parliamentarian, 2017
 Parliamentary Conference on the WTO - The Parliamentarian, 2017

See also
Parit Sulong (federal constituency)

References

External links
 

Living people
1967 births
People from Johor
Malaysian people of Malay descent
Malaysian Muslims
United Malays National Organisation politicians
Government ministers of Malaysia
Education ministers of Malaysia
Members of the Dewan Rakyat
Women members of the Dewan Rakyat
Women in Johor politics
University of Saskatchewan alumni
21st-century Malaysian politicians
21st-century Malaysian women politicians